The 1942–43 Division 2 season was the second tier of ice hockey in Sweden in for the 1942–43 season.  The league operated a system of promotion and relegation, to the first-tier Svenska Serien and to district-level hockey leagues.  The league consisted of four groups, two with seven clubs (north and east) and two with six (central and south), giving a total of 26 clubs.  The group winners, Brynäs IF (north), IF Aros (central), Nacka SK (east), and Årsta SK (south) won their groups, and continued to play in a qualifier for promotion to Svenska Serien, which resulted in Brynäs and Nacka being promoted to the 1943–44 Svenska Serien.  IFK Stockholm finished last in Division 2 North, and as a result were relegated to their local level hockey league.

Final standings

North group

Central group

East group

South group

Svenska Serien qualifier
The winning teams from each group—Brynäs IF (north), IF Aros (central), Nacka SK (east), and Årsta SK (south)—played a qualifier for promotion to Sweden's first-tier hockey league.  Brynäs and Nacka won this qualifier, and as a result competed in the 1943–44 Svenska Serien.

See also
 1942–43 Svenska Serien season
 1943 Swedish Ice Hockey Championship

External links
 Division 2 norra 1942/43 on Svenskhockey.com
 Division 2 centrala 1942/43 on Svenskhockey.com
 Division 2 östra 1942/43 on Svenskhockey.com
 Division 2 södra 1942/43 on Svenskhockey.com

Division 2 (Swedish ice hockey) seasons
2